Papa Blues is Papa John Creach's 1992 album, his final studio album, and his only album released after the 1970s.

Track listing
"Sweet Life Blues" (Bernie Pearl) – 4:15
"Bumble Bee Blues" (traditional) – 5:17
"Old Fashioned Papa" (Pearl) – 5:03
"Big Leg Baby" (Lermon Horton) – 5:17
"Why Don't You Let Me Be" (Big Terry DeRouen) – 4:45
"Scufflin'" (Pearl) – 5:17
"Tired of Crying" (DeRouen) – 4:23
"Papa Blues" (Papa John Creach) – 6:25
"I Think You're Stepping Out on Me" (Doug MacLeod) – 3:42
"Train to Memphis" (Pearl) – 4:13
"Walking My Way Back to You" (Doug MacLeod) – 4:04
"Girl, You Must Be Crazy" (DeRouen) – 5:09
"Baby Please Don't Go" (Big Joe Williams) – 4:02

Personnel
Papa John Creach – electric violin, vocals

Bernie Pearl Blues Band
Bernie Pearl – guitar, saxophone
Big Terry DeRouen – guitar
Mike Barry – bass
Albert Trepagnier – drums
Dwayne Smith – piano

Papa John Creach albums
Papa John Creach